The Mountain Eagle Commando Unit is a police tactical unit of the People's Armed Police based in the Xinjiang Autonomous Region. The unit was publicly shown to the media on 20 August 2019. Its name is derived from its designated operational areas, consisting of mountains and plateaus.

It is the third police tactical unit to be established by the People's Armed Police after the Snow Leopard Commando Unit and the Falcon Unit.

Mission 
The Mountain Eagle Commando was revealed under the 2017-2018 People's Armed Police reform and is tasked to deal with counterterrorism missions in Xinjiang. The unit is specially trained in order to conduct operations on horseback to deal with terrain difficult for vehicles.

Operations 
According to the People's Liberation Army Daily, the unit has an intense operational history.

References 

Units and formations of the People's Armed Police
Special forces of the People's Republic of China
Police tactical units